Roman Vladimirovich Kuznetsov (born 14 August 1989), is a Russian taekwondo athlete. He won the bronze medal at the 2017 World Taekwondo Championships in the heavyweight category. He also won a gold medal at the Moscow series of the 2017 World Taekwondo Grand Prix, defeating Korean Kyo-Don In.

References

External links 
Profile on Taekwondodata

Living people
Russian male taekwondo practitioners
1989 births
Sportspeople from Irkutsk
Universiade medalists in taekwondo
Universiade gold medalists for Russia
European Taekwondo Championships medalists
World Taekwondo Championships medalists
Medalists at the 2009 Summer Universiade
21st-century Russian people
20th-century Russian people